Kelly Boyle (born 11 May 1996) is a Scottish netball player who plays for Scotland and for Sirens Netball club in the positions of wing attack or center. She made her World Cup debut for Scotland during the 2019 Netball World Cup.

She studied at University of the West of Scotland, graduating with a BSc in Sport Coaching in 2018.

References 

1996 births
Living people
Scottish netball players
2019 Netball World Cup players
Netball Superleague players
Sirens Netball players
Alumni of the University of the West of Scotland